Werndorf is a municipality in the district of Graz-Umgebung in the Austrian state of Styria.

Population

References

Cities and towns in Graz-Umgebung District